Feelin' All Right is the tenth studio album and twelfth album overall by the country rock band the New Riders of the Purple Sage.  Released in 1981, it was their only album on the A&M Records label.  Produced as a vinyl LP, it has not been released in CD format.

Feelin' All Right was the last studio album by the New Riders that featured both John "Marmaduke" Dawson and David Nelson as full-time band members (although Nelson made a guest appearance on 1992's Midnight Moonlight).  The two had co-founded the band in 1969 with Jerry Garcia of the Grateful Dead. Also included in the lineup was longtime member Buddy Cage on pedal steel guitar, along with guitarist Allen Kemp and drummer Patrick Shanahan.  Kemp wrote or co-wrote seven of the ten songs on the album, his first as a member of NRPS.

Track listing
Side one:
"Night for Making Love" (John Dawson, David Nelson, Allen Kemp) – 3:12
"No Other Love" (Dawson, Kemp) – 3:02
"The Way She Dances" (Dawson, Kemp) – 2:49
"Tell Me" (Kemp) – 3:26
"Fly Right" (Kemp) – 3:09
Side two:
"Crazy Little Girl" (Dawson, Kemp) – 3:20
"Full Moon at Midnight" (Dawson, Kemp) – 3:20
"Pakalolo Man" (Jack Miller) – 2:42
"Day Dreamin' Girl" (M. O'Gara) – 2:56
"Saralyn" (Dawson) – 2:50

Personnel

New Riders of the Purple Sage
John Dawson – guitar, vocals
David Nelson – guitar, vocals
Buddy Cage – pedal steel guitar
Allen Kemp – guitar, vocals
Patrick Shanahan – drums, vocals

Additional musicians
Michael White – bass
Andre Lewis – synthesizer

Production
Chuck Mellone – producer
Alex Kash – engineer
Jim Tronge – assistant engineer
Dave Curtin – assistant engineer
Frank DeLuna – mastering
Ed Caraeff – photography, design
Frank Fenter – executive supervision for Fast Forward Productions, Inc
Recorded at the Record Plant, Sausalito, California

Notes

New Riders of the Purple Sage albums
1981 albums
A&M Records albums